Pheugopedius is a genus of wrens in the family Troglodytidae whose species were formerly included in Thryothorus.  It contains the following species:

 Black-throated wren (Pheugopedius atrogularis)
 Rufous-breasted wren (Pheugopedius rutilus)
 Moustached wren (Pheugopedius genibarbis)
 Coraya wren (Pheugopedius coraya)
 Plain-tailed wren (Pheugopedius eophrys)
 Black-bellied wren (Pheugopedius fasciatoventris)
 Sooty-headed wren (Pheugopedius spadix)
 Speckle-breasted wren (Pheugopedius sclateri)
 Happy wren (Pheugopedius felix)
 Inca wren (Pheugopedius eismanni)
 Spot-breasted wren (Pheugopedius maculipectus)
 Whiskered wren (Pheugopedius mystacalis)

 
Higher-level bird taxa restricted to the Neotropics